The EB Cloete Interchange near Durban in South Africa is the interchange between the two national roads that pass through Durban: the N2 and N3. It has been given various nicknames, the most famous one is "Spaghetti Junction". The N3 is the busiest highway in South Africa and is a very busy truck route. Since Johannesburg is not located near a body of water such as a river or an ocean, most of the city's exports rely on the Port of Durban to export its goods. The N2 connects Cape Town with Durban, and it serves other South African cities as well, such as Port Elizabeth, East London, George and the towns of Mthatha, Port Shepstone and Richards Bay and Greater St. Lucia Wetland Park. Two very busy roads intersect at this junction, thus leading to a very busy junction. A four level stack interchange was chosen for this junction to serve the high volumes of traffic. This is the only 4 level interchange in South Africa.

Origin of nickname

The interchange's nickname comes from that of Gravelly Hill Junction in Birmingham, UK, which had opened fifteen years previously and been given the nickname "Spaghetti Junction" by locals.

References

N2 road (South Africa)
N3 road (South Africa)
Metaphors referring to spaghetti
Road interchanges in South Africa